Philisca is a genus of South American anyphaenid sac spiders first described by Eugène Simon in 1884.

Species
 it contains fourteen species:
Philisca accentifera Simon, 1904 – Chile, Argentina
Philisca amaena (Simon, 1884) – Chile, Argentina
Philisca atrata Soto & Ramírez, 2012 – Chile, Argentina
Philisca doilu (Ramírez, 1993) – Chile, Argentina
Philisca hahni Simon, 1884 – Chile, Argentina
Philisca huapi Ramírez, 2003 – Chile, Argentina
Philisca hyadesi (Simon, 1884) – Chile, Argentina
Philisca ingens Berland, 1924 – Chile (Juan Fernandez Is.)
Philisca ornata Berland, 1924 – Chile (Juan Fernandez Is.)
Philisca pizarroi Soto & Ramírez, 2012 – Chile (Juan Fernandez Is.)
Philisca robinson Soto & Ramírez, 2012 – Chile (Juan Fernandez Is.)
Philisca robusta Soto & Ramírez, 2012 – Chile (Juan Fernandez Is.)
Philisca tripunctata (Nicolet, 1849) – Chile, Argentina, Falkland Is.
Philisca viernes Soto & Ramírez, 2012 – Chile (Juan Fernandez Is.)

References

Anyphaenidae
Araneomorphae genera
Spiders of South America
Taxa named by Eugène Simon